FC Wageningen (before 1978 Wageningen and WVV Wageningen) was a Dutch football club which was founded on 27 August 1911., The club played its matches in the Wageningse Berg stadium.

Its first success came on 18 June 1939, when the team won the KNVB Cup by defeating PSV Eindhoven (2–1 after extra-time) in Arnhem. Nine years later, on 19 June 1948, FC Wageningen once again won the Cup, this time by a win over DWV.

The club went bankrupt in 1992, and played its last match in May 1992 against NAC Breda. It was disestablished on 30 June.
The amateur branch still exists as WVV Wageningen.

Honours
KNVB Cup: 2
 1938–39, 1947–48
Tweede Divisie: 1
 1967–68

Results 1963 – 1992

Former managers
Jan Mastenbroek (1939–1960)
Bas Paauwe (1964–1968)
Maarten Vink (1968–1973)
Fritz Korbach (1973–1977)
Frans Körver (1977–1980)
Nol de Ruiter (1980–1982)
Jan Versleijen (1982–1984)
Hans Boersma (1984–1985)
Arie Schans (1985–1986)
Piet Schrijvers (1987–1989)
Piet Buter (1989–1991)
Pim Verbeek (1991–1992)
Willem van Hanegem assistant (1990–1991)

References

 
Defunct football clubs in the Netherlands
Association football clubs established in 1911
Association football clubs disestablished in 1992
1911 establishments in the Netherlands
1992 disestablishments in the Netherlands
Football clubs in Wageningen
History of Wageningen